The Government of Canada Building is one of the tallest buildings in Moncton, New Brunswick. The building is 34 meters tall and has 9 floors. The building was constructed in 1977 and is located at 777 Main Street in downtown Moncton. It is mainly used as offices for the Government of Canada as well as various lawyers. The entire top floor of the building is occupied by offices for Freedom 55 Financial and the Quadrus Group both divisions of the London Life Insurance Company.

The façade of this building underwent an aesthetic upgrade in 2008.

See also
 List of tallest buildings in Moncton

External links
 Building information
 Heritage Group Properties (building managers)

Buildings and structures in Moncton
Canadian federal government buildings
Office buildings completed in 1977
1977 establishments in New Brunswick
Government buildings completed in 1977

fr:Édifice du gouvernement du Canada à Moncton